Döbrönte is a village in Veszprém county, Hungary.

Etymology 
The name comes from Slavic personal name Dobręta. Debrenta, 1240.

References

External links 
 Street map (Hungarian)

Populated places in Veszprém County
Hungarian German communities